Tracey Moffatt  (born 12 November 1960) is an Indigenous Australian artist who primarily uses photography and video.

In 2017 she represented Australia at the 57th Venice Biennale with her solo exhibition, "My Horizon". Her works are held in the collections of the Tate, Museum of Contemporary Art, Los Angeles, National Gallery of Australia, Art Gallery of South Australia and Art Gallery of New South Wales.

She currently lives in Sydney and New York City.

Though she is best known for her photographic works, Moffatt has created numerous films, documentaries and videos. Her work often focuses on Australian Aboriginal people and the way they are understood in cultural and social terms.

Early life and education 

Moffatt was born in Brisbane in 1960 to a white father and an Aboriginal mother. At age three she was fostered out of her family, growing up as the eldest of three daughters in a white family and often left to look after her foster sisters.

Moffatt holds a degree in visual communications from the Queensland College of Art, graduating in 1982, and received an honorary doctorate in 2004. 

In 2020, Moffatt was awarded an Honorary Fellowship of the Royal Photographic Society.

Early works 

Moffatt's first short film was Nice Coloured Girls, made in 1985. It is a 16-minute story of three young Aboriginal women as they cruise Sydney's King's Cross entertainment district looking for fun, presented in cut-away context with the historical oppression of Indigenous women by white men. Gail Mabo acted in this film, and also danced in and choreographed another of Moffatt's short films, Watch Out.

Commissioned by the Murray Art Museum Albury and shot in Link Studios in Wodonga, Something More (1989) is a photographic series composed of six vibrant Cibachrome colour prints and three black-and-white prints. It is a now iconic series of photographs that built Moffatt's first widespread public attention, each of which borrows from film language to construct what is described as "an enigmatic narrative of a young woman looking for more out of life than the circumstances of her violent rural upbringing." Night Cries (1989/1990) is one of Moffatt's best-known films. Inspired by the 1955 classic Australian film Jedda, and sharing similar aesthetics to Something More, it tells the story of an Aboriginal woman forced to care for her ageing white mother.

1990s 

Moffatt's photographic series o (1991) and Laudanum (1998) returned to the themes of Something More exploring mixed and sometimes obscure references to issues of sexuality, history, representation and race. Other series of images, notably Scarred for Life (1994) and Scarred for Life II (1999) again tackled these themes but which referenced the photojournalism and photo essays of Life magazine accompanied by captions. While the words are compelling, they don't explain the images, indeed they tend to add to their enigmatic nature as though more information is a further dead end.

As her work progressed over the next decade, Moffatt began to explore narratives in more gothic settings. In Up in the Sky (1998) the artist's work again used a sequential narrative but instead of using fantasy settings, a story concerning Australia's "stolen generation" – Indigenous Australian children who were taken from their families and forcibly relocated under Government policy – was enacted and performed on location in Queensland's outback. Like Something More, Up in the sky employs the theme of race and violence, displaying a loose narrative set against the backdrop of a remote town, 'a place of ruin' and devastation populated by misfits and minor characters. It is one of Moffatt's larger series of photographs and takes its visual ideas from Italian modernist cinema Accattone (1961) by Pier Paolo Pasolini. The story relies on a triangular mixed-race relationship. Of this work Moffatt stated: 'My work is full of emotion and drama, you can get to that drama by using a narrative, and my narratives are usually very simple, but I twist it ... there is a storyline, but ... there isn't a traditional beginning, middle and end.'

2000s 

In 2000, Moffatt's work was amongst those by eight individual or collaborative groups of Indigenous Australian artists included in a major exhibition of Australian Indigenous art held in the prestigious Nicholas Hall at the Hermitage Museum in Russia. The exhibition received a positive reception from Russian critics, one of whom wrote:

Moffatt's work since 2000 has retreated from specific locales and subject matter and become more explicitly concerned with fame and celebrity. Her series Fourth (2001) used images of sportspeople from the 2000 Summer Olympic Games coming fourth in their various competitions. Seeking to underline their outsider status, the images are treated so only the ignoble fourth place holder is highlighted.

2003 saw Moffatt named by Australian Art Collector magazine as one of the country's 50 most collectible artists.

Adventure Series (2004) is Moffatt's most unabashed fantasy series using painted backdrops, costumes and models (including the artist herself) to enact a soap opera like drama of doctors, nurses and pilots in a tropical setting. Under The Sign of Scorpio (2005) is a series 40 images in which the artist takes on the persona of famous women born – like the artist – under the zodiac sign of Scorpio. The series reiterates the artist's ongoing interests in celebrity, alternate personas and constructed realities. Moffatt's 2007 series Portraits explores the idea of 'celebrity' among people in her immediate social circle – family members, fellow artists, her dealer – through 'glamorised' renderings of their faces using computer technology, repetitive framing and bright colours.

In 2008 Moffatt held her "first substantial exhibition to date" at Dia Art Foundation in the United States, featuring the photo series Up in the Sky (1997).

2010s 

In 2017 Moffatt was selected to represent Australia at the Venice Biennale for her solo exhibition "My Horizon", which was curated by Natalie King. The exhibition consisted of two videos, The White Ghosts Sailed In and Vigil, and two series of photographs, Body Remembers and Passage. My Horizon tackles problems of colonialism and imperialism in Australia and how it affects the Indigenous population. This biennial is the first time since 1997 that Australia has been represented by an Indigenous artist.

2020s

From 28 May until 24 July 2022, the exhibition Land Abounds, featuring the work of brothers Abdul Abdullah and Abdul-Rahman Abdullah as well as video works by Moffatt, runs at the NSW Southern Highlands gallery of Ngununggula (meaning "belonging".  Abdul-Rahman said:

Film and video work 

Moffatt's work in film and video has included short films, experimental video and a feature film. The short films rely on the stylistic genre features of experimental cinema – usually including non-realist narrative scenarios often shot on sound stages echoing her work in still photography. Early works such as Nice Coloured Girls and Night Cries also use sound mixes that reinforce the 'fakeness' of the settings and use well-worn experimental cinema devices such as audio field recordings and low tones to provide atmosphere.  Her short video works such as Artist (2000) use the cut up methodology of taking images from pre-existing sources and re-editing them into ironic commentaries on the material – Artist for example providing a commentary on the clichéd role of the artist in Hollywood cinema, and her Doomed (2007) – made in collaboration with the artist Gary Hillberg – a collection of scenes of destruction from disaster movies. Her feature film Bedevil is a trio of narratives themed around spirits and hauntings.

Night Cries: A Rural Tragedy (1989) 

Primarily concerned with a series of almost static vignettes, Night Cries reiterates many of Moffatt's visual motifs from her still photography – sets, non-acting, an evocative use of sound and music.  In Night Cries Moffatt's attempts to draw ironic or romantic connotations in juxtaposition to the images and narratives, such as her use of Jimmy Little. Moffatt also makes explicit references to Australian art history, drawing parallels between Indigenous history and the recording the landscape by non-Indigenous artists by quoting artists such as Frederick McCubbin's The Pioneer. The short film was selected for official competition at the Cannes Film Festival in 1990. 

In the film, Moffatt reminds and displays history of the colonial past of Aboriginal people. The film makes connections between Aboriginal people and their colonizers by touching on systems that were used by colonizers to harm and put Aboriginals at a disadvantage. In the film, there is a clear tension and mixed feelings between the characters, one being a white woman and the other an Aboriginal woman, who play adoptive mother and daughter, respectively.

Moffatt uses different aspects of colonization of Aboriginal people to illustrate the damage and hurtful events that took place, reminding viewers of the past colonial history.

Bedevil (1993) 

Shown at the 1993 Cannes Film Festival, Bedevil is composed of three self-contained narratives with recurring visual motifs. In the first story Mister Chuck Moffatt uses the character of an American soldier, in the second part Choo Choo Choo Choo railway tracks connect a series of events and in the final part Lovin' the Spin I'm in a landlord who evicts a family from a house. The images were partly inspired by memories from her early life.

Heaven (1997) 

Moffatt's film, Heaven, is a voyeuristic montage of footage depicting men getting changed at Australian beaches.

Lip (1999) 

In Lip, Moffatt collates clips of black servants in Hollywood movies talking back to their 'bosses', attempting to expose the attitudes to race often found in mainstream cinema. Also, this film is written on two women, one white and one black. In this film, the story line shows the conflict between the white woman and the black woman who is her maid. It shows racial tensions.

Artist (2000) 

Moffatt's Artist is a collection of clips from movies and television programs that depict artists at work, at play and in the act of creation. By showing the particular bias of television and cinema to what the role of an artist apparently means to modern society, the film reflects the sometimes uninformed, sometimes humorous view of society towards artists today.

Revolution (2008) 

Commissioned for the 16th Biennale of Sydney in 2008.

References

External links 

 
 Night Cries at Oz Movies
 Tracey Moffatt at the Art Gallery of New South Wales
 

1960 births
Living people
Australian photographers
Australian experimental filmmakers
Australian film directors
Australian Aboriginal artists
Australian women film directors
Australian video artists
Queensland College of Art alumni
Artists from Brisbane
Australian women photographers
Australian contemporary artists
Officers of the Order of Australia
20th-century Australian artists
20th-century Australian women artists
21st-century Australian women artists
21st-century Australian artists
Women experimental filmmakers
20th-century women photographers
21st-century women photographers